Lodja Airport  is an airport serving Lodja, a city in Sankuru Province, Democratic Republic of the Congo.

The Lodja VOR (ident: LJA) is on the airfield.

Airlines and destinations

See also

 Transport in the Democratic Republic of the Congo
 List of airports in the Democratic Republic of the Congo

References

External links
 Lodja Airport at OpenStreetMap
 Lodja Airport at OurAirports
 
 Lodja Airport at HERE Maps
 

Lodja